Olavi Rove (29 July 1915 – 22 May 1966) is a Finnish gymnast and Olympic Champion.

He was born and died in Helsinki.

He competed at the 1948 Summer Olympics in London where he received a gold medal in team combined exercises, and a silver medal in vault. 
At the 1952 Summer Olympics in Helsinki he received a bronze medal in team combined exercises with the Finnish team.

References

1915 births
1966 deaths
Finnish male artistic gymnasts
Gymnasts at the 1948 Summer Olympics
Gymnasts at the 1952 Summer Olympics
Olympic gymnasts of Finland
Olympic gold medalists for Finland
Olympic medalists in gymnastics
Medalists at the 1952 Summer Olympics
Medalists at the 1948 Summer Olympics
Olympic silver medalists for Finland
Olympic bronze medalists for Finland
Sportspeople from Helsinki
20th-century Finnish people